Ghallooghaaraa is the Punjabi word for a massacre or great destruction and may refer to:

 Chhotaa Ghallooghaaraa, which happened on 1 May 1746
 Wadda Ghallooghaaraa, which happened on 5 February 1762

See also
 Sikh genocide (disambiguation)